Marco Berger (born 8 December 1977) is an Argentine film director and screenwriter.

He studied at the Universidad del Cine in Buenos Aires and made his directorial debut in 2007 with the short films Última voluntad and El reloj. His first feature film was Plan B, which was presented on a number of film festivals (Buenos Aires, Rome, London). But it was with the film Ausente (English title Absent) that he won "Best feature film" for what the judging committee said was "an original screenplay, an innovative aesthetic and a sophisticated approach, which creates dynamism. A unique combination of homoerotic desire, suspense and dramatic tension."

Filmography

Films
 Plan B (2009)
 Absent (Ausente) (2011)
 Hawaii (2013)
 Butterfly (2015)
 Taekwondo (2016) with Martin Farina
 The Blonde One (Un rubio) (2019)
 El Cazador (2020)

Collaborations
 Cinco (2010) – with Cinthia Varela, Cecilia del Valle, Andrew Sala and Francisco Forbes
 Tensión sexual, Volumen 1: Volátil – with Marcelo Mónaco
 Tensión sexual, Volumen 2: Violetas – with Marcelo Mónaco
 Taekwondo (2016) – jointly directed with Martín Farina

Shorts
 Una última voluntad (2007)
 El reloj (2008)

Other works
 Fulboy (2014) as editor

Awards
In 2011, Berger won the Teddy Award for Best Feature Film at the Berlin International Film Festival for his film Ausente.

Personal life
Marco Berger is openly gay.

See also
"Berger shot"

References

External links

1977 births
Date of birth missing (living people)
Living people
Argentine film directors
LGBT film directors
21st-century Argentine male writers
Argentine gay writers
Argentine LGBT screenwriters
Gay screenwriters
Argentine people of Norwegian descent
Argentine people of Scandinavian descent